Mihai Apostol (born 21 January 1997) is a Moldovan football player who plays as midfielder for Dutch club Always Forward SV.

Career

Club career
A scout from Portuguese club União Leiria persuaded Apostol to come to Portugal, which he did. Two days after his 18th birthday, he travelled to Portugal and joined the club, playing for the club's U19 team. Apostol wanted to stay at the club but had to return to Moldova because his residence permit expired.

In the summer 2019, Apostol moved to the Netherlands because he got a job in West Friesland. Apostol was allowed to train with HVV Hollandia, but however, the club already had too many players in his position. Hollandia's coach, Anand Jagdewsing, then tipped Apostol about Always Forward SV, which he ended up joining. This was Apostol's second adventure abroad, having previously played in three months for FC Orchomenos in Greece.

References

External links

1997 births
Living people
Moldovan footballers
Moldovan expatriate footballers
Moldova youth international footballers
Moldovan Super Liga players
CSF Bălți players
FC Academia Chișinău players
FC Codru Lozova players
Association football midfielders
Moldovan expatriate sportspeople in Portugal
Moldovan expatriate sportspeople in the Netherlands
Moldovan expatriate sportspeople in Greece
Expatriate footballers in Portugal
Expatriate footballers in the Netherlands
Expatriate footballers in Greece